Nikollë Filja (1691–1769), was an Arbëreshë Byzantine rite priest, and writer of the 18th century, who is known for his translations of biblical fragments into Arbëresh for children, as well as an Arbëreshë folklorist. The Figlia (Filja) family is a known Arbëreshë one from Mezzojuso in Sicily, who were originally settlers from Filati in Chameria, today's northern Greece.

References

1691 births
1769 deaths
Writers from the Province of Palermo
Albanian folklorists
Italian people of Arbëreshë descent
18th-century Italian writers
18th-century Italian male writers
18th-century Albanian writers
18th-century translators
Greek–Albanian translators
Albanian translators
Italian translators
Albanian male writers